Unity is an album by jazz organist Larry Young, released on the Blue Note label in August, 1966. The album features trumpeter Woody Shaw, tenor saxophonist Joe Henderson and drummer Elvin Jones. While not free jazz, the album features experimentation that was innovative for the time. Young chose the title because, "although everybody on the date was very much an individualist, they were all in the same frame of mood. It was evident from the start that everything was fitting together." The album was Young's second for Blue Note, and is widely considered a "post-bop" classic.

Music
Three of the six tracks were composed by Woody Shaw. The first, "Zoltan", starts with part of a march from the Háry János suite of Zoltán Kodály and continues in the Lydian mode. The second, "The Moontrane", is dedicated to John Coltrane, "as can be heard in the harmonic cycles in it", explained Shaw. The third, "Beyond All Limits", has a difficult harmonic progression, but, in Shaw's words, "once the inherent difficulties of the tune are solved, there are no limits as to where you can go with it". "If" is a 12-bar Joe Henderson composition; "Monk's Dream" (played only by Young and drummer Elvin Jones) is by Thelonious Monk; and "Softly, as in a Morning Sunrise" is a Hammerstein & Romberg composition.

Elvin Jones played "a standard 4-piece drum kit with two cymbals and hi-hat".

Reception
Scott Yanow states that Unity "is considered Larry Young's finest recording". Billboard Magazine called the album "a sureshot for jazz fans". The Penguin Guide to Jazz included the album in its suggested “core collection”,  and awarded it a rare crown and four-star rating, describing it as "Quite simply a masterpiece." Also, saxophonist Michael Brecker referred to the album as a favourite of his.

The album's cover art, by Reid Miles, has also become well known. In 2008, graphic designer Mike Dempsey picked it as one of his favorite album covers, stating that it shows "Ultimate simplicity [...] Put in an album rack today it would still raise an eyebrow as it looks remarkably fresh".

Track listing

Original CD

2014 Blue Note SHM-CD Remaster Edition (Japan Release)

Personnel

Musicians
Larry Young – Hammond B-3 organ
Woody Shaw – trumpet
Joe Henderson – tenor saxophone
Elvin Jones – drums

Production
Alfred Lion – production
Rudy Van Gelder – recording engineering; CD remastering (1998)
Michael Cuscuna – reissue production
Reid Miles – cover design
Francis Wolff – photography
Nat Hentoff – liner notes
Bob Blumenthal – CD reissue liner notes (1999)

References

1966 albums
Blue Note Records albums
Larry Young (musician) albums
Albums produced by Alfred Lion
Albums recorded at Van Gelder Studio